The High Peaks is a region of the US state of Maine, lying entirely within Franklin County. It is roughly bounded by State Route 4 to the southwest, State Route 16 to the northwest, State Route 16/27 to the northeast and State Route 142 to the southeast. The region contains eight of the 14 Maine 4,000-footers and includes  contiguously above . By comparison, Baxter State Park, which contains Maine's highest mountain, Mount Katahdin, and has a similar overall land area, has roughly 15% less contiguous land over 2700 feet.

References 

Regions of Maine
New England Four-thousand footers
Mountains of Franklin County, Maine
Mountains of Maine